Békéscsaba 1912 Előre is a professional association football club based in Békéscsaba, Hungary.

Key

Nemzeti Bajnokság I
 Pld = Matches played
 W = Matches won
 D = Matches drawn
 L = Matches lost
 GF = Goals for
 GA = Goals against
 Pts = Points
 Pos = Final position

Hungarian football league system
 NBI = Nemzeti Bajnokság I
 NBII = Nemzeti Bajnokság II
 NBIII = Nemzeti Bajnokság III
 MBI = Megyei Bajnokság I

Magyar Kupa
 F = Final
 SF = Semi-finals
 QF = Quarter-finals
 R16 = Round of 16
 R32 = Round of 32
 R64 = Round of 64
 R128 = Round of 128

UEFA
 F = Final
 SF = Semi-finals
 QF = Quarter-finals
 Group = Group stage
 PO = Play-offs
 QR3 = Third qualifying round
 QR2 = Second qualifying round
 QR1 = First qualifying round
 PR = Preliminary round

Seasons

Notes
 Note 1: The 2019-20 Nemzeti Bajnokság II was interrupted by the Covid 19 pandemic.

References

Békéscsaba 1912 Előre